The 1980 Individual Speedway World Championship was the 35th edition of the official World Championship to determine the world champion rider.

With 1979 World Champion Ivan Mauger failing to qualify for a World Final for the first time since 1966, and Ole Olsen only qualifying as a reserve, the 1980 World Final at the Ullevi Stadium in Göteborg, Sweden was seen as an open final with a number of potential winners. Michael Lee, Bruce Penhall, Dave Jessup and Billy Sanders considered the favourites with Jan Andersson (the only Swedish rider in the World Final), John Davis, Hans Nielsen, Zenon Plech, Intercontinental Final winner Chris Morton and 1976 World Champion Peter Collins all expected to challenge.

Twenty-one-year-old English ace Lee who had only finished 7th in the Intercontinental Final at White City, won his only World Championship with 14 points from his 5 rides. Dave Jessup finished second after defeating Billy Sanders in a runoff when both riders finished on 12 points to give England a 1-2 finish in a World Final.

Michael Lee became only the fifth rider from Great Britain to win Motorcycle speedway's ultimate individual prize, joining Welshman Freddie Williams (1950), and fellow Englishmen Tommy Price (1949), Peter Craven (1955 and 1962) and Peter Collins (1976) as a Speedway World Champion.

British Qualification

British Final
June 4, 1980
 Coventry, Brandon Stadium
First 10 to Commonwealth Final plus 1 reserve

Swedish Qualification

Swedish Final
May 20, 1980
 Norrköping
Winner to World Final, riders 2-5 to Nordic Final

New Zealand Final
 2 February 1980
  Aucland
 First 8 to Austral-Asian Final

Intercontinental Round

American Final
November 16, 1979
 Anaheim, Anaheim Stadium
First 2 to Intercontinental Final

Austral-Asian Final

February 2, 1980
 Christchurch, Ruapuna Speedway
First 5 to Commonwealth Final plus 1 reserve
Ivan Mauger seeded to Commonwealth final

Danish Final

May 4, 1980
 Fredericia
First 6 to Nordic final

Norwegian Final

May 18, 1980
 Skien
First 3 to Nordic final

Nordic Final
June 15, 1980
 Skien
First 5 to Intercontinental Final

Commonwealth Final
June 29, 1980
 London, Wimbledon Stadium
First 9 to Intercontinental Final plus 1 reserve

Intercontinental Final
August 3, 1980
 London, White City Stadium
First 10 to World Final plus 1 reserve

Continental Round

Continental Final
July 27, 1980
 Lonigo, Pista Speedway
First 5 to World Final plus 1 reserve

World Final
5 September 1980
 Göteborg, Ullevi
 Referee: Torrie Kittlesen
 Attendance: 35,000 (approx)

References

1980
World Individual
1980 in Swedish motorsport
Speedway competitions in Sweden